Edward E. Cherry Jr. (October 12, 1954) is an American jazz guitarist and studio musician. Cherry is perhaps best known for his long association with trumpeter Dizzy Gillespie, with whom he performed from 1978 until shortly before Gillespie's death in 1993. Since that time, he has worked with Paquito D'Rivera, Jon Faddis, John Patton, Hamiet Bluiett, Henry Threadgill, and Paula West. He has recorded a number of albums as a leader.

Discography

As leader
 First Take (Groovin' High, 1993)
 Second Look (Groovin' High, 1994)
 The Spirits Speak (Justin Time, 2001)
 Create with Marco Marzola (Wide Music [it], 2005)
 It's All Good (Posi-Tone, 2012)                                        
 Soul Tree (Posi-Tone, 2016)
 Are We There Yet (Cellar Live, 2022)

As sideman
With Hamiet Bluiett
 With Eyes Wide Open (Justin Time, 2000)

With Brian Charette
 Jackpot (Cellar Live, 2022) 

With Paquito D'Rivera
 Havana Cafe (Chesky, 1991)

With Jon Faddis
 Hornucopia (Epic, 1991)

With Ken Fowser
 Right On Time (Posi-Tone, 2019)

With Dizzy Gillespie
 Musician, Composer, Raconteur (Pablo, 1981) with Milt Jackson
 Live at the Royal Festival Hall (Enja, 1989) 
 Live! at Blues Alley (Blues Alley, 1992)

With Jared Gold
 Supersonic (Posi-Tone, 2009) 
 Golden Child (Posi-Tone, 2012)

With New York Funkies
 Hip Hop Bop! (Meldac [jp], 1995) with Stanley Turrentine, Reuben Wilson

With Ben Paterson
 Live at Van Gelder's (Cellar Live, 2018)

With John Patton
 Blue Planet Man (Paddle Wheel [jp], 1993; Evidence, 1997) with John Zorn
 Minor Swing (DIW, 1994 [rel. 1995]) with John Zorn
 This One's for Ja (DIW, 1996 [rel. 1998])

With Dr. Lonnie Smith
 In The Beginning: Volumes 1 & 2 (Pilgrimage Records, 2013)

With Henry Threadgill
 Song Out of My Trees (Black Saint, 1994)
 Makin' a Move (Columbia, 1995)

With Jason Tiemann
 T-Man (T-Man Records, 2020)

With Doug Webb
 Bright Side (Posi-Tone, 2016)

With Charles Williams
 When Alto Was King (Mapleshade, 1997)

References

External links
 DownBeat magazine blindfold test

African-American jazz guitarists
American male guitarists
1954 births
Guitarists from Connecticut
Living people
20th-century American guitarists
Jazz musicians from Connecticut
20th-century American male musicians
American male jazz musicians
Posi-Tone Records artists
20th-century African-American musicians
21st-century African-American people